The Annapoorneshwari Temple is a Hindu temple dedicated to the goddess Annapoorneshwari (Annapoorna), located at Horanadu, Karnataka, India, 100 km from Chikmagalur in the thick forests and valleys of the Western Ghats of Karnataka. It is situated on the banks of river Bhadra.

Legend
The temple is also known as Adhishakthyathmaka Sri Annapoorneshwari Ammanavara Temple or Sri Kshetra Horanadu Temple. It is believed that the sage Agastya established the icon of the goddess here. 

As per legend, the god Shiva and his wife Parvati - the presiding goddess of food Annapoorna, had an argument. Shiva declared everything in the world including food to be maya (illusion). To prove that food is not an illusion, Parvati disappeared resulting in nature becoming still. Neither climate changed nor plants grew, causing drought in the world. Taking pity on the world, Parvati appeared as Annapurneshwari and distributed food to all.

According to another tale, due to Brahma's ego, Shiva beheaded his fifth head, which signified the ego of Brahma. Brahma's head decayed and his skull got stuck in Shiva’s hand. Brahma cursed him that till the skull is not full of food or grains, it will stick to his hands. Shiva took the form of a beggar, Bhikshatana, roamed the earth and asked for food but the skull was never full. So he finally went to his wife Parvati who had taken the form of Annapurneshwari and she filled the skull with grains and reversed Shiva’s curse.

History
Hereditary Dharmakartharu priests started in this temple from past 400 years. The same family is serving and preserving the temple since then. Dharmakartharu have played an instrumental role in refurbishing the temple as well as in performing the rituals here. The temple premise was small and unknown to many till the fifth Dharmakartharu Sri D.B. Venkatasubba Jois repaired and revived the temple. The goddess icon was reestablished in 1973 on the auspicious day of Akshaya Tritiya.

Deity and rituals
The word Annapoorna is made of two words Anna meaning rice grains or food and Poorna meaning perfect and complete. Hence, Annapoorna means complete or perfect food. Sri Annapoorneshwari is believed to be an incarnation of Goddess Parvati, wife of Lord Shiva.

Devi Annapoorna is lauded and appraised in several ancient texts like Rudrayamala, Annapurnamalininaksatramalika, Sivarahasya, and Annapurna Kavacha.

Goddess Annapoorneshwari's idol can be seen here in a standing pose on a peetha (pedestal). She is holding the Shankha, Chakra, Sri Chakra and Devi Gayatri in her four hands. The idol is covered in gold from head to toe, and it is believed that whom so ever visits her, will never go hungry in their lives.

Akshaya Thadige or Akshaya Tritya is the main festival celebrated in this temple. This day is believed to be the birth date of the goddess. This day marks as the beginning of Treta Yuga as well as the end of winters and the start of summers. The temple also celebrates 5-day long Rathotsaya during the month of February, 9-day long Navaratri during September, Deepotsava and Havi with great enthusiasm.

Architecture
To reach the main temple complex, worshipers have to climb a flight of steps. The Gopura (entrance) of the temple is adorned with several sculptures of Hindu deities. Mantapa is located on the left-hand side of the main temple entrance. Beautiful carvings can be found on the ceilings of the temple. Adi Sesha surrounds the main sanctum or the Garbhagruha of the temple and the Padma Peeta consists of Koorma, Ashtagaja and others.

See also
 Marikamba Temple, Sirsi

References

Devi temples in Karnataka
Tourist attractions in Chikkamagaluru district